"This One's Gonna Hurt You (For a Long, Long Time)" is a song written by American country music artist Marty Stuart, who recorded the song as a duet with Travis Tritt. It was released in June 1992 as the first single from Stuart's album This One's Gonna Hurt You.  It peaked at #7 in the United States, and #6 Canada.

Music video
The music video was directed by John Lloyd Miller. It was filmed in a recording studio with Stuart and Tritt singing the song (accompanied by Stuart's backing band), and is entirely in black and white.

Chart performance
"This One's Gonna Hurt You (For a Long, Long Time)" debuted at number 58 on the U.S. Billboard Hot Country Singles & Tracks for the week of June 6, 1992.

Year-end charts

References

Marty Stuart songs
Travis Tritt songs
1992 singles
Male vocal duets
Song recordings produced by Tony Brown (record producer)
Songs written by Marty Stuart
MCA Records singles
Music videos directed by John Lloyd Miller
Black-and-white music videos
1992 songs